The NWA World Historic Welterweight Championship (Campeonato Mundial Historico de Peso Welter de la NWA in Spanish) is a professional wrestling championship governed by Consejo Mundial de Lucha Libre (CMLL). CMLL had held the NWA World Welterweight Championship for over 53 years even after leaving the NWA in 1989. In 2010 the National Wrestling Alliance, represented by Blue Demon Jr., the president of NWA Mexico, sent letters to CMLL telling them to stop promoting NWA-branded championships since CMLL was not part of the NWA any longer. On August 12, 2010, CMLL debuted the new NWA World Historic Welterweight Championship belt and named Mephisto, the final CMLL-recognized NWA World Welterweight Champion, as the inaugural champion. The championship was initially announced as the CMLL Historic Welterweight Championship, but when the belt was unveiled, it was labelled the "NWA World Historic Welterweight Championship".

Rocky Romero is the current NWA World Historic Welterweight Champion, having defeated Volador Jr. on January 20, 2023. This is Romero's first reign with the title; he is the tenth overall champion. Volador Jr.'s third reign was the longest of any NWA World Historic Welterweight Champion at 1,631 days. All title matches take place under best two-out-of-three falls rules when they take place in Mexico, but has been defended in single fall matches in Japan.

History

In 1948 the Mexican lucha libre or professional wrestling promotion Empresa Mexicana de Lucha Libre (EMLL; Spanish for "Mexican Wrestling Enterprise") created the World Welterweight Championship. When EMLL became a member of the National Wrestling Alliance (NWA) in 1952 the championship was given the "NWA" prefix and became known as the NWA World Welterweight Championship. In the late 1980s, EMLL left the National Wrestling Alliance (NWA) to avoid the politics of the NWA. While they left the NWA they did retain control of the NWA World Welterweight Championship as their main championship of the welterweight division. They also promoted the Mexican National Welterweight Championship as a secondary title in the Welterweight division. In 1992 EMLL changed their name and became known as Consejo Mundial de Lucha Libre (CMLL; "World Wrestling Council") to rebrand themselves as a separate entity after leaving the NWA. They added a third welterweight championship to the promotion when they created the CMLL World Welterweight Championship on February 15, 1992.

After the introduction of the CMLL championship, the then-reigning NWA World Welterweight Championship Misterioso left CMLL, vacating the championship. For the subsequent three years, CMLL did not promote the NWA World Welterweight Championship until bringing it back in the winter of 1995. Negro Casas won the championship, holding it until August 1996 where he lost it as part of a tournament to create the J-Crown, eight championships unified as one. from 1996 through 2007 the championship was promoted in Japan, but on November 27, 2007, La Sombra defeated Hajime Ohara to bring the championship back to CMLL.

In 2010 the NWA, represented by NWA Mexico president Blue Demon Jr., reached out to CMLL and asked them to stop using the NWA-branded championships since they were not part of the NWA. Blue Demon Jr. was in the process of establishing NWA Mexico as a promotion and wanted to use the championship. There had been previous attempts by the NWA to gain back control of the three NWA-branded championships that CMLL used, the welterweight championship as well as the NWA World Light Heavyweight Championship and the NWA World Middleweight Championship, but in those instances, CMLL had not responded to those requests at all. The promotion did not directly respond to the latest claim; the NWA Welterweight Champion, Mephisto, commented instead, simply stating that the championships belonged to CMLL. Finally, on August 12, 2010, CMLL debuted the new NWA World Historic Welterweight Championship belt and named Mephisto, the final CMLL-recognized NWA World Welterweight Champion, as the inaugural champion. The championship was initially announced as the CMLL Historic Welterweight Championship, but when the belt was unveiled, it was called the NWA World Historic Welterweight Championship.

Reigns

Rocky Romero is the current NWA World Historic Welterweight Champion, having won the title on January 20, 2023, defeating Volador Jr.. He is the tenth overall champion. Volador Jr. and La Sombra are the only two wrestlers to hold the championship at least twice. Volador Jr's second reign is the longest individual reign while La Sombra's 56-day reign in 2014 is the shortest of all championship reigns. On January 22, 2012, La Sombra became the first champion to defend the NWA World Historic Welterweight Championship outside of Mexico as he defeated Volador Jr. during the CMLL and New Japan Pro-Wrestling (NJPW) co-promoted Fantastica Mania 2012 in Tokyo, Japan.

At the age of  when he won the championship the first time, La Sombra is the youngest wrestler to win the championship. At  at the time of his title win, Negro Casas is the oldest wrestler to win the championship.

Rules
As a professional wrestling championship, it is not won legitimately; it is instead won via a predefined outcome of matches. In the 20th century Mexican wrestling enforced the weight divisions more strictly, but in the 21st century the rules have occasionally been ignored for some of the weight divisions. While the heavyweight championship is traditionally considered the most prestigious weight division in professional wrestling, CMLL places more emphasis on the lower weight divisions. All title matches promoted in Mexico take place under best two-out-of-three falls rules, while championship matches promoted in Japan followed the local custom and were only one fall matches.

Title history

Combined reigns

Key

Footnotes

References

Bibliography

Consejo Mundial de Lucha Libre championships
Welterweight wrestling championships
World professional wrestling championships